Steven James Rodríguez (born November 29, 1970) is an American baseball coach and former second baseman/shortstop, who is the current hitting coach for the Texas Longhorns. He played college baseball for the Pepperdine Waves from 1991 to 1992. He played in Major League Baseball (MLB) during the 1995 season. He served as the head coach of the Pepperdine Waves (2004–2015) and the Baylor Bears (2016–2022).

A native of Las Vegas, Nevada, he was selected by Boston in the fifth-round of the 1992 draft out of Pepperdine. He would play briefly for the Boston Red Sox and Detroit Tigers during the 1995 season. Rodríguez was hired as the 19th head coach of the Baylor University baseball team on June 12, 2015.

Playing career

High school
Rodriguez attended Valley High School in Winchester, Nevada. Prior to being recruited by the Pepperdine Waves baseball team, he had never heard of Pepperdine University and did not know where Malibu was. Nonetheless, he was won over by handwritten letters from coach Andy Lopez.

College
A two-time All-American (1991–92), Rodríguez helped his team claim its only national championship in the 1992 College World Series, when he was named West Coast Conference Player of the Year and also was a member of the All-Tournament Team. Rodríguez collected a .419 batting average –the third-highest single-season average in school history– and his 104 base hits that season are also a Pepperdine single-season record, as he finished with a .382 average in the round-robin phase of the 1991 Pan American Games for the Bronze Medal USA baseball team, earning Player of the Series honors against Mexico and Cuba. Then, in 1992, Rodríguez was named one of the West Coast Conference's Top Fifty Athletes of all time.

Major League Baseball
In an 18-game major league career, Rodríguez was a .179 hitter (7-for-39) with five runs, two doubles, and two stolen bases without home runs or an RBI.  He also played in the Red Sox, Tigers, Los Angeles Dodgers and Montreal Expos minor league systems from 1992 to 1998, hitting .263 with 16 home runs and 205 RBI in 613 games.

Coaching career
Following his playing career, Rodríguez served as an assistant coach at his alma mater from 2000 to 2003, and was the head coach from 2004 to 2015.  He was hired as the sixteenth head coach in the history of the Pepperdine baseball program in June 2003, to become only the third former Pepperdine player head coach for the Waves in the program's sixty-five-year history.

Taking over a young team in 2004, Rodríguez guided Pepperdine to the WCC Championship where the Waves swept conference rival Loyola Marymount University in the best-of-three WCC championship series.

In 2015, Rodriguez was hired to be the head coach at Baylor.

On July 7, 2022, Rodriguez joined the staff of the Texas Longhorns as the team's hitting coach.

Head coaching records
Below is a table of Rodriguez's yearly records as an NCAA head baseball coach.

See also
1991 College Baseball All-America Team

References

External links

1970 births
Living people
All-American college baseball players
American expatriate baseball players in Canada
Baseball players at the 1991 Pan American Games
Baseball coaches from Nevada
Baseball players from Nevada
Baylor Bears baseball coaches
Boston Red Sox players
Detroit Tigers players
Major League Baseball infielders
Ottawa Lynx players
Pan American Games bronze medalists for the United States
Pan American Games medalists in baseball
Pawtucket Red Sox players
Pepperdine Waves baseball coaches
Pepperdine Waves baseball players
Sportspeople from Las Vegas
Texas Longhorns baseball coaches
Toledo Mud Hens players
Winter Haven Red Sox players
Medalists at the 1991 Pan American Games
American sportspeople of Salvadoran descent
Alaska Goldpanners of Fairbanks players